Qaleh-ye Sangi (also Romanized as Qal‘eh-ye Sangī and Qal’eh Sangī; also known as Sangī) is a village in Qomrud Rural District, in the Central District of Qom County, Qom Province, Iran. At the 2006 census, its population was 15, in 4 families.

References 

Populated places in Qom Province